This is a list of songs that topped the Belgian Walloon (francophone) Ultratop 40 in 2003.

Best-selling singles 

This is the ten best-selling/performing singles in 2003.

See also
2003 in music

References

2003 in Belgium
2003 record charts
2003

de:Liste der Nummer-eins-Hits in Belgien (2003)